Zampa is a French opéra comique.

Zampa may also refer to:

People
Adam Zampa (born 1992), Australian cricketer
Adam Žampa (born 1990), Slovakian alpine skier
Al Zampa (1905–2000), American bridge worker
Alfred Zampa Memorial Bridge, bridge named after Al Zampa
Andreas Žampa (born 1993), Slovakian alpine skier
Enrico Zampa (born 1992), Italian footballer
Luigi Zampa (1905–1991), Italian film director
Sandra Zampa (born 1956), Italian politician

Places
Pangri Zampa Monastery, a monastery in Bhutan
Zampa, Burkina Faso, a town

Other
Euphaedra zampa, a type of butterfly
Grover Zampa, a Indian vineyard and wine production company
Zampa the Lion, a Millwall football mascot